The Kingsway Regional School District is a regional public school district serving students from five communities in Gloucester County, New Jersey, United States. The district serves students in seventh through twelfth grades from East Greenwich Township, South Harrison Township, Swedesboro and Woolwich Township. Students in ninth through twelfth grades from Logan Township who attend as part of a sending/receiving relationship in which tuition is paid on a per-pupil basis by the Logan Township School District.

As of the 2019–20 school year, the district, comprised of two schools, had an enrollment of 2,868 students and 210.0 classroom teachers (on an FTE basis), for a student–teacher ratio of 13.7:1.

The Kingsway Regional School District is classified by the New Jersey Department of Education as being in District Factor Group "FG", the fourth-highest of eight groupings. District Factor Groups organize districts statewide to allow comparison by common socioeconomic characteristics of the local districts. From lowest socioeconomic status to highest, the categories are A, B, CD, DE, FG, GH, I and J.

History
Designed with 40 classrooms built to accommodate an enrollment of 1,100 and constructed at a cost of $1.75 million on a site covering , the school opened in September 1963 for an initial enrollment of 675 students in grades 7-12, including students in grades 9-12 who had previously attended Swedesboro High School, which ended operations after 40 years. Prior to the school's opening, students had attended either Sweedesboro High School or Woodstown High School.

Under a 2011 proposal, Kingsway would merge with its constituent member's K-6 districts to become a full K-12 district, with various options for including Logan Township as part of the consolidated district.

Schools 
Schools in the district (with 2019–20 enrollment data from the National Center for Education Statistics) are: 
Kingsway Regional Middle School with 1,025 students in grades 7-8
Kingsway Regional High School with 1,783 students in grades 9-12

Both schools are located in Woolwich Township.

Administration
Core members of the district's administration are:
Dr. James J. Lavender, Superintendent
Jason Schimpf, Business Administrator

Board of education
The district's board of education, comprised of nine elected members, sets policy and oversees the fiscal and educational operation of the district through its administration. As a Type II school district, the board's trustees are elected directly by voters to serve three-year terms of office on a staggered basis, with three seats up for election each year held (since 2012) as part of the November general election. The board appoints a superintendent to oversee the day-to-day operation of the district. Seats on the board of education are allocated based on the population of the constituent districts, with four seats assigned to Woolwich Township, three to East Greenwich Township and one each to South Harrison Township and Swedesboro. The Logan Township district appoints a member to serve on the Kingsway board.

References

External links 
Regional School District

Data for the Kingsway Regional School District, National Center for Education Statistics

1963 establishments in New Jersey
School districts established in 1963
East Greenwich Township, New Jersey
Logan Township, New Jersey
New Jersey District Factor Group FG
School districts in Gloucester County, New Jersey
South Harrison Township, New Jersey
Swedesboro, New Jersey
Woolwich Township, New Jersey